USS Billfish (SSN-676), a Sturgeon-class attack submarine, was the second ship of the United States Navy to be named for the billfish, a  name used for any fish, such as gar or spearfish, with bill-shaped jaws.

Construction and commissioning
The contract to build Billfish was awarded to the Electric Boat Division of General Dynamics Corporation in Groton, Connecticut, on 15 July 1966 and her keel was laid down on 20 September 1968.  She was launched on 1 May 1970 sponsored by Mrs. Earle G. Wheeler, the wife of Chairman of the Joint Chiefs of Staff General Earle G. Wheeler (1908–1975), and commissioned on 12 March 1971.

Service history

Billfish was one of the few submarines fitted to carry Mystic class deep submergence rescue vehicle during the 1980s.

Decommissioning and disposal
Billfish was decommissioned on 1 July 1999 and stricken from the Naval Vessel Register the same day. Her scrapping was via the Nuclear-Powered Ship and Submarine Recycling Program at Puget Sound Naval Shipyard in Bremerton, Washington, was completed on 26 April 2000.

References

NavSource Online: Submarine Photo Archive Billfish (SSN-676)

External links

 USS Billfish SSN 676 (Web site created by former USS Billfish (SSN-676) crew member)

 

Ships built in Groton, Connecticut
Sturgeon-class submarines
Cold War submarines of the United States
Nuclear submarines of the United States Navy
1970 ships